Linda Frances Elide Lusardi (born 18 September 1958) is an English actress, television presenter and former glamour model.

Career

Modelling
Lusardi was born in Wood Green, London to Lilian (née Glassman, b. 1933) and Nello Lusardi (1930–2017). Her mother was born in Edmonton, Middlesex and her father in Hackney, East London to Italian parents. Lusardi grew up in Palmers Green. In 1976, at the age of 18, she began appearing as a Page 3 girl in The Sun and continued to appear until 1988. She also appeared nude in the men's magazines Mayfair in February 1977 and Fiesta in November 1977.

Television, film and stage acting
As an actress, Lusardi has appeared in the drama series  The Bill playing the girlfriend of corrupt officer DS Don Beech and also in Hollyoaks and  Brookside. On 12 February 2007, she joined the cast of Emmerdale  as Carrie Nicholls, an ex-girlfriend of Tom King and mother of his secret child, Scarlett. She left the programme after a year.

Lusardi has appeared in movies including Snappers, The Zero Imperative, Oh Minnie, Consuming Passions and The Krays: Dead Man Walking.

Lusardi has starred as Eliza Doolittle in Pygmalion at the Malvern Festival and toured in Happy as a Sandbag, Funny Peculiar, Bedside Manners, Not Now, Darling, Rock with Laughter, No Sex Please, We're British, and Doctor on the Boil. Lusardi took her own show to the British Forces in Belize, the Falklands and Northern Ireland.

She is a supporter of UK pantomime and often stars with her husband Sam Kane each Christmas at major theatres in the UK. Recent venues have been Woking, Southend-on-Sea, Plymouth, and Llandudno. Lusardi has starred in over 25 pantomimes.

Other television work
Lusardi appeared in two series of A Kind of Magic, as assistant to Wayne Dobson on ITV, and a season of Loose Women in 2002. She later returned in 2014 to 2015 and made a few guest panellist appearances. She regularly presented Wish You Were Here...?, Miss Northern Ireland, chat show It's Bizarre, Film Review and No Smoking on ITV. Lusardi took part in the reality show The Games in 2004, ITV daytime programme Have I Been Here Before? and BBC One's Hole in the Wall in 2009. She also sells Lusardi My Miracle, a range of skin-care products, on shopping television channel Ideal World.

In 1992, she appeared in the "Dead Ringer" observation round of The Krypton Factor and appeared in a special edition of Bullseye presented by Jim Bowen. Lusardi appeared on Ant & Dec's Saturday Night Takeaway on ITV and in the Royal Variety Performance, as well as Celebrity Eggheads and  Pointless Celebrities on the BBC. She also appeared briefly as herself in the BBC sitcom Detectorists.

Reality TV
In January 2008, Lusardi joined ITV's Dancing on Ice, finishing in sixth place. Her professional skating partner was Daniel Whiston, who temporarily moved into her family home to make training more convenient. Lusardi had to catch up with her fellow skaters after falling and breaking a bone in her foot during her first hour on the ice. She also won the Channel 4 show Celebrity Come Dine With Me in 2008. In the show, she was voted the best dinner host by her fellow contestants Abi Titmuss, Rodney Marsh, Lesley Joseph and Paul Ross. Lusardi participated in the 2011 series of Celebrity Masterchef, where she reached the final five. In December 2020, she took part in The Real Full Monty on Ice for charity.

Personal life
During the 1980s, Lusardi married a builder named Terry Bailey and they were often featured in the News of the World's Sunday supplement magazine, "Sunday". They divorced in 1996. In 1998, Lusardi married actor Samuel Kane and they have two children, son Jack and daughter Lucy. She is patron of two charities, the Willow Foundation and the Rhys Daniels Trust.

In March 2020, during the COVID-19 pandemic in the United Kingdom, Lusardi was diagnosed with COVID-19 and was admitted to hospital. She tweeted that she had "never felt this ill" but later made a full recovery.

References

External links
 
 Linda Lusardi's Official Website
 Linda Lusardi's Official Blog

1958 births
Living people
English female adult models
English television actresses
English soap opera actresses
English television personalities
People from Palmers Green
English people of Italian descent
Page 3 girls